Magnus Georg von Paucker (– )  was a Baltic German astronomer and mathematician and the first Demidov Prize winner in 1832 for his work Handbuch der Metrologie Rußlands und seiner deutschen
Provinzen.

Biography
Paucker was born in the small Estonian village of Sankt Simonis (now ). In 1805, he began his studies in astronomy and physics at the University of Dorpat, where his professors included Georg Friedrich Parrot and Johann Wilhelm Andreas Pfaff. Between 1808–1809, Paucker took part in the surveying of the Emajõgi river which was the first geodetic expedition on the territory of Estonia. In 1809 he contributed to the construction of the first optical telegraph line in Russia from Saint Petersburg to Tsarskoye Selo.

In 1811, Paucker took over as a lecturer at the University of Dorpat, succeeding 
Ernst Friedrich Knorre. In 1813 he was awarded his Ph.D. for a thesis in solid physics titled De nova explicatione phaenomeni elasticitatis corporum rigidorum.

Paucker left Dorpat (now ) in 1813 and stayed the rest of his life in Mitau (now ) where he was a professor of mathematics at the Mitau Gymnasium and an organizer of the first scientific society in Latvia, the Courland Society of Literature and Arts.

References

1787 births
1855 deaths
People from Väike-Maarja Parish
People from the Governorate of Estonia
Baltic-German people
Astronomers from the Russian Empire
19th-century German astronomers
University of Tartu alumni
Demidov Prize laureates